Furcinula is a genus of moths belonging to the subfamily Tortricinae of the family Tortricidae.

Species
Furcinula perizoma Diakonoff, 1960
Furcinula punctulata Diakonoff, 1960

See also
List of Tortricidae genera

References

External links
tortricidae.com

Archipini
Tortricidae genera